William Byrne is a former boxer from New Zealand. He won the silver medal in the Lightweight (75 – 81 kg) division at the 1974 British Commonwealth Games.

References

Living people
Year of birth missing (living people)
Commonwealth Games silver medallists for New Zealand
Boxers at the 1974 British Commonwealth Games
New Zealand male boxers
Commonwealth Games medallists in boxing
Light-heavyweight boxers
20th-century New Zealand people
Medallists at the 1974 British Commonwealth Games